Hulda is a genus of moths belonging to the family Tortricidae. It contains only one species, Hulda impudens, which is found in North America, including North Carolina and Saskatchewan.

The wingspan is 13–14 mm.

See also
List of Tortricidae genera

References

External links
tortricidae.com

Moths described in 1884
Endotheniini
Moths of North America